Setacera breviventris is a species of shore flies in the family Ephydridae.

Distribution
Angola, Kenya, Nigeria, Australia, Guam, Solomon Islands, Bangladesh.

References

Ephydridae
Insects described in 1860
Diptera of Africa
Diptera of Asia
Diptera of Australasia
Taxa named by Hermann Loew